Pedistylis is a genus of flowering plants belonging to the family Loranthaceae.

Its native range is Southern Tropical and Southern Africa.

Species
Species:
 Pedistylis galpinii (Schinz ex Sprague) Wiens

References

Loranthaceae
Loranthaceae genera